The 1894 Michigan State Normal Normalites football team represented Michigan State Normal School (later renamed Eastern Michigan University) during the 1894 college football season.  In their first and only season under head coach Verne S. Bennett, the Normalites compiled a record of 5–2 and outscored their opponents by a combined total of 176 to 70. Charles D. Livingston was the team captain.

Schedule

References

Michigan State Normal
Eastern Michigan Eagles football seasons
Michigan State Normal Normalites football